This is a list of unincorporated communities in Nebraska.  All communities on this list are census-designated places, are listed on the official Nebraska highway map, have post offices located in the community, or have FIPS place codes.

A 
Akron
Almeria
Amelia
Ames
Angora
Antioch
Archer
Ashby
Assumption
Aten

B 
Belmar
Berea
Bingham
Boone
Bow Valley
Bookwalter
Brandon
Brownlee
Buda

C 
Chalco
Champion
Cisco
Cumminsville

D 
Dickens
Darr

E 
Eli
Ellis
Ellsworth
Emerald
Enders

F 
Fontanelle

G 
Gladstone
Glenwood
Grainton

H 
Harrisburg
Holmesville
Howe

I 
Inavale
Inland

J 
Joder

K 
Keystone
King Lake
Kramer

L 
La Platte
Lakeside
Lakeview
Lemoyne
Lindy
Lisco
Loma
Lorenzo
Loretto

M 
Macy
Marsland
Martell
Martin
Mascot
Max
Milburn
Mills

N 
Nashville
Norden

O 
Odessa
Offutt AFB
Overland

P 
Paul
Parks
Poole
Prairie Home
Princeton
Purdum

R 
Raeville
Rescue
Richfield
Roscoe
Rose

S 
Saint Mary
Sarben
Seneca
St. James
St. Libory
St. Michael
Sparks
Sunol
Shadow Lake
Sweetwater

T 
Tamora
Tryon

V 
Venice

W 
Walton
Wann
Weissert
Westerville
Whiteclay
Whitman
Willow Island
Woodland Hills
Woodland Park

Y 
Yankee Hill

See also
List of cities in Nebraska
List of villages in Nebraska

 
Unincorporated communities
Nebraska